Piet Blom (February 8, 1934, Amsterdam – June 8, 1999, Denmark) was a Dutch architect best known for his 'Kubuswoningen' (cube houses) built in Helmond in the mid-1970s and in Rotterdam in the early 1980s. He studied at the Amsterdam Academy of Building-Arts as a student of Aldo van Eyck.

Blom was selected as the Dutch Prix de Rome recipient in 1962.

Blom, Aldo van Eyck, Herman Hertzberger and others are representatives of the Structuralism movement.

There is a museum dedicated to Blom's works that opened in May 2013 in Hengelo, Netherlands.

References

External links 
Piet Blom website
Cubic Houses website
Piet Blom Museum

1934 births
1999 deaths
Modernist architects
Structuralists
Architects from Amsterdam
Prix de Rome (Netherlands) winners
20th-century Dutch architects